Highway 318 is a highway in the Canadian province of Saskatchewan. It runs from Highway 18 near Carnduff to Highway 361 near Alida.

References

318